The 1947 Montana Grizzlies football team was an American football team that represented the University of Montana as a member of the Pacific Coast Conference (PCC) during the 1947 college football season.

Under ninth-year head coach Doug Fessenden, Montana compiled a 7–4 record (2–1 in PCC), with home games played on campus at Dornblaser Field in Missoula, Montana.

The coaching staff included Harry Adams as backs coach and Paul Szakash as line coach.

Schedule

References

External links
 Game program: Montana at Washington State – October 25, 1947

Montana
Montana Grizzlies football seasons
Montana Grizzlies football